Several Canadian naval units have been named HMCS Gatineau.

  (I) was a former Royal Navy Interwar Standard E-class destroyer transferred to the Royal Canadian Navy for service in the Second World War.
  (II) was a  escort that served during the Cold War.

Battle honours
Atlantic 1943-44
Normandy 1944

Set index articles on ships
Royal Canadian Navy ship names